White Island Pond is a system of two ponds in Plymouth and Wareham, Massachusetts. The pond is located east of Glen Charlie Pond in Wareham and, in Plymouth, south of Halfway Pond, southwest of Fawn Pond and Deer Pond, and west of Ezekiel Pond. White Island Shores lies along this pond.

External links
Environmental Protection Agency for map of western basin
Environmental Protection Agency for map of eastern basin
White Island Pond Conservation Alliance

Wareham, Massachusetts
Ponds of Plymouth, Massachusetts
Ponds of Plymouth County, Massachusetts
Ponds of Massachusetts